Luka Mesec (born 1 July 1987) is a Slovenian politician and activist who has been the leader of the eco-socialist The Left party since June 2017. Mesec was elected to the Slovenian National Assembly for the first time at the 2014 parliamentary election, and reelected at the 2018 parliamentary election. He is the coordinator of the Council of the Initiative for Democratic Socialism, Labour-Punk University, and its successor, the Institute for Labour Studies.

Early life and education
Luka Mesec was born on 1 July 1987 in Kranj. He grew up in Železniki, where he finished elementary and high school, after which he enrolled in the political science program at the University of Ljubljana's Faculty of Social Sciences. In 2012, he received a bachelor's degree in European studies. As a student, Mesec was active in the Selca Valley Student Club, the Polituss Student Political Science Club, the Mi smo univerza movement, and the Prekercev front. Since 2010, he has participated in the work of the "Labour-Punk University," an activist organization that introduced democratic socialism to Slovenian politics, and the Institute for Labor Studies.

Political career
Mesec participated in the 2012–13 Slovenian protests. He was elected to the Slovenian National Assembly at the 2014 parliamentary election, and reelected in 2018. Under his leadership, The Left party connected with member parties of the Party of the European Left, including Greek Syriza, French Left Front, German The Left, and Spanish United Left. On June 1, 2022 he was appointed Deputy Prime Minister and Minister for Labor, Family, Social Affairs and Equal Opportunities in the government of Robert Golob.

Political positions
Mesec advocates participatory economics, social corporate governance, tax relief for the poor, labor rights and the abolition of tax havens, and is against neoliberalism, which, in his opinion, is nothing more than a class struggle of capital against organized labor. He believes that Europe, which once had a strong social democracy and trade unions, is experiencing this class struggle under the guise of European integration, in which countries compete against each other instead of being based on reciprocity.

References

1987 births
Living people
Deputy Prime Ministers of Slovenia
Labour ministers of Slovenia
People from Kranj
People from Železniki
Social affairs ministers of Slovenia
University of Ljubljana alumni